The crystal skipper (Atrytonopsis quinteri) is a species of butterfly in the family Hesperiidae that is found only along a 30-mile (50 km) stretch of barrier islands in North Carolina. The skipper was first discovered in 1978 and the paper describing it as a full species was published in 2015.

Distribution 

The crystal skipper is endemic to Bogue Banks and Bear Island in North Carolina, USA.  Bogue Banks is approximately 25 miles long and Bear Island is about 3.5 miles long.  The skipper is also found on several human-made dredge spoil islands within the vicinity of these two natural barrier islands.

Bear Island, part of Hammocks Beach State Park, is completely undeveloped and has the largest skipper population.  The second largest population is at Fort Macon State Park, on the eastern end of Bogue Banks.  The remaining populations are smaller and scattered between these two state parks.

Taxonomy and common name 

Burns described Atrytonopsis quinteri as a full species, and details differences in anatomy with related species A. hianna, A. vierecki, A. lunus, A. pittacus, A. python, A. margarita, and A. cestus. The species was believed to be either 1) a full species in the genus Atrytonopsis, 2) a subspecies of A. hianna (the dusted skipper), 3) a subspecies of A. loammi (which some consider to be a subspecies of A. hianna), or 4) the same species as A. loammi. Field guides and checklists often group Atrytonopsis new species 1 with A. loammi.  How A. quinteri differs from the very similar A. loammi of coastal Florida is unclear, as Burns does not discuss differences with that species.

A formal common name has not been given for this species, but the most frequently used one is the crystal skipper. It is called the crystal skipper because it is native to the section of the North Carolina called the Crystal Coast and because it has white spots on its wings that look like crystals.

Life cycle 

The crystal skipper has two broods per year.  The first brood emerges from the chrysalis stage from mid-April to mid-May.  Adults from this brood mate and the females then lay eggs.  The eggs hatch into caterpillars, which feed, grow and then undergo pupation to form a chrysalis.  After metamorphosis, the second brood adults emerge between mid-July and mid-August.  The caterpillars from this brood will grow until fall and then overwinter. The following spring they complete metamorphosis and the cycle repeats.  Therefore, the adults in the spring of the second year are the grandchildren of the brood from the previous spring.

The crystal skipper lays its eggs on seaside little bluestem, Schizachyrium littorale, and the caterpillars feed on this grass.

Habitat 

The crystal skipper is found along primary and secondary sand dunes where its hostplant, seaside little bluestem (Schizachyrium littorale), is present.  Although the largest and most dense populations of the skipper are usually on undisturbed sand dunes, the skipper can also persist in small patches of sand dune habitat, such as undeveloped lots in urban areas.  Additionally, the crystal skipper is found on several human-made dredge spoil islands that have been colonized by seaside little bluestem.

Conservation status 

The crystal skipper is globally rare but locally abundant.  Much of the sand dunes on Bogue Banks have been destroyed by development, leaving little habitat for the crystal skipper outside the two state parks.

The crystal skipper is a federal species of concern.  A “species of concern” is an informal designation by the U.S. Fish and Wildlife Service and is not a term that is defined under the U.S. Endangered Species Act.  The crystal skipper is not federally listed as threatened or endangered.  Insects cannot be listed under the North Carolina Endangered Species Act.

Conservation and restoration 

Crystal skippers rely on flowers for nectar and seaside little bluestem for hostplants.  Retaining native vegetation in your yard, especially dune grasses such as seaside little bluestem, can help create habitat for the crystal skipper and other native animals.  Alternately, you could try actively planting seaside little bluestem.

Native flowers that are commonly used for sources of nectar during the spring crystal skipper brood include: Yellow thistle (Cirsium horridulum), risky tread-softly or spurge nettle (Cnidoscolus stimulosus), southern dewberry (Rubus trivialis), and coastal prickly pear (Opuntia pusilla).  The summer brood of crystal skippers frequent morning glory (Ipomoea spp), especially in the morning.  Non-native plants (also called exotic plants) that are a common source of nectar include Lantana species.

References 

Burns, J.  2000.  A striking new species of skipper butterfly on the North Carolina coast.  51st Annual Meeting of the Lepidopterists Society, Wake Forest University, Winston-Salem, NC.

Burns, J. 2015. Speciation in an insular sand dune habitat: Atrytonopsis (Hesperiidae: Hesperiinae) - mainly from the southwestern United States and Mexico - off the Carolina coast.  Journal of the Lepidopterists' Society 69(4):275-292. 

Leidner, A. K. 2009.  Butterfly conservation in fragmented landscapes.  PhD dissertation, North Carolina State University.  

Leidner, A.K. and N.M. Haddad.  2010.  Natural, not urban, barriers limit dispersal of a coastal endemic butterfly.  Conservation Genetics 11:2311-2320. 

Leidner, A.K. and N.M. Haddad.  2011.  Combining measures of dispersal measures to identify conservation strategies in fragmented landscapes.  Conservation Biology 25:1022-1031 

Hall, S.P. 2003. Status survey for Atrytonopsis new species 1 in North Carolina. Report to the US Fish & Wildlife Service, Raleigh Field Office, Raleigh, NC.

Hesperiidae
Butterflies of North America